The Only Witness by Jude Watson is the seventeenth in a series of young reader novels called Jedi Apprentice. The series explores the adventures of Qui-Gon Jinn and Obi-Wan Kenobi prior to Star Wars: Episode I – The Phantom Menace.

Plot
A witness asks for escort and protection from the Jedi Order. She wants to testify against her family - the Cobral group - who control the planet of Frego much like the Syndicat controlled Phindar. An older Obi-Wan Kenobi and his master, Qui-Gon Jinn, have been sent to protect her, but they suspect that she is hiding something.

The Cobral family stop at nothing to ensure that the witness does not testify, but they eventually fail. She is escorted to Coruscant, where she successfully testifies.

Characters
Bard Cobral
Lena Cobral
Solan Cobral
Zanita Cobral
Crote
Qui-Gon Jinn
Juno
Obi-Wan Kenobi
Plo Koon
Mica
Jocasta Nu
Finis Valorum
Mace Windu
Yoda

See also

Star Wars: Jedi Apprentice , the main series for this book

References

External links
Official CargoBay Listing
TheForce.net review

2002 American novels
2002 science fiction novels
Star Wars: Jedi Apprentice
All stub articles